October 2012

See also

References

 10
October 2012 events in the United States